The Tchaikovsky Secondary Music School, is a secondary school in Yerevan, Armenia which opened in 1939. The school is a specialized secondary school where a total of 600 students are enrolled in a 12-year education, while at the same time receiving 2 certificates of general and vocational education. Over 70 percent of the school's alumni attend the Komitas State Conservatory of Yerevan.

History and organization

The school was founded on April 19, 1939, and two years later it was named after Pyotr Ilyich Tchaikovsky. Until 1975, 665 graduates have been awarded. In 1982, A sculpture of Tchaikovsky (made by architects Yervand Goghabashyan, and Jim Torosyan) was erected on the front of the school building. Since Armenian independence, the school has been renovated under the auspices of the Hayastan All-Armenian Fund.

It is up of piano, violin, cello, viola, contrabass, harp, brass and musical education departments. Besides the school's main curriculum, the school has a children's choir, an orchestra, and a band (which is made up of smaller symphonic, jazz, and brass bands).

Layout of the building
The central building has been completely upgraded and replenished with stalls, the gym has been reconstructed, the concert hall has a playground, comfortable conditions have been created for musicians and spectators. Special rooms were built for the school's symphonic, jazz, and brass band, the violin ensemble, and the choir.

Notable alumni

 Anahit Nersesyan
 Ara Torosyan
 Araksi Sarian-Harutunian
 Geghuni Chitchian
 Jean Ter-Merguerian
 Medea Abrahamyan
 Ruben Aharonyan
 Vahagn Hayrapetyan
 Sofya Melikyan
 Tigran Hamasyan
 Armen Poghosyan

See also

 Education in Armenia
 Mkhitar Sebastatsi Educational Complex
 List of Armenian schools

References

Armenian schools
Educational institutions established in 1938
Schools in Armenia
Music schools in Armenia
Secondary schools in Armenia
1938 establishments in the Soviet Union